Tafari is a surname. Notable people with the surname include:

Jack Tafari (1946–2016), British-American homelessness activist
Levi Tafari, British actor and poet
Tafari Moore (born 1997), English footballer

See also 
 Teferi, a variant name
 Haile Selassie, birth name Tafari Makonnen Woldemikael
 Rastafari
 Tafani